Rockport virus (RKPV) is a single-stranded, enveloped, negative-sense RNA orthohantavirus.

Natural reservoir 
Rockport virus was first isolated in archival tissues of four Eastern moles found in and around Rockport, Texas.

Virology 

Phylogenetic analysis shows Rockport virus clusters geographically with Andes virus (ANDV) and Sin Nombre virus (SNV), both of which are carried by sigmodontine and Neotominae rodents. It shares the same S and the L genomic-segment with Puumala virus (PUUV), Tula virus (TULV), and Prospect Hill virus (PHV).

See also 
 Hantavirus pulmonary syndrome
 1993 Four Corners hantavirus outbreak
 Cross-species transmission
 Hantavirus hemorrhagic fever with renal syndrome

References

External links 
 CDC's Hantavirus Technical Information Index page
 Viralzone: Hantavirus
 Virus Pathogen Database and Analysis Resource (ViPR): Bunyaviridae
 Occurrences and deaths in North and South America

Hantaviridae
Zoonoses